"French Kissin" (released in certain countries as "French Kissin in the USA") is a song by American singer Debbie Harry from her second solo studio album, Rockbird (1986). It was released on November 3, 1986, as the album's lead single. 

It is a cover of the 1985 song originally recorded by Carol Chapman, written by Chuck Lorre before he started creating sitcoms.

Song information
In the United Kingdom, the song was released as the album's lead single on November 3, 1986, and became Harry's biggest chart hit, reaching number eight on the UK Singles Chart and becoming her only solo top-10 single there. In the United States, the song peaked at number 57 on the Billboard Hot 100.

For promotion, Harry did a live performance of "French Kissin" and "In Love with Love" on Saturday Night Live, as well as a handful of television interviews in the UK and US in late 1986. A music video (featuring several women including a few short sequences by actress Katey Sagal) was also made and subsequently played on music video channels. Besides the regular 7-inch and 12-inch formats, the single was also released as a limited-edition 12-inch picture disc in the UK.

Harry also recorded a French-language version of the track which was released as the B-side of other Rockbird singles and was also included on the 1988 Blondie/Debbie Harry remix compilation Once More into the Bleach.

The song was originally released by Carol Chapman in 1985, as the B-side of the single "Bad Dreams in Hollywood", the only release Chapman ever did. Chapman's song was used by two movies: Can't Buy Me Love (1987) and Troop Beverly Hills (1989). The song was written by Chuck Lorre.

Track listings
7-inch single
A. "French Kissin" (Chuck Lorre) – 4:09
B. "Rockbird" (Deborah Harry, Chris Stein) – 3:09

US 12-inch single
A1. "French Kissin" (dance mix) (Lorre) – 7:25
A2. "French Kissin" (edit) (Lorre) – 4:09
B1. "French Kissin" (dub version) (Lorre) – 8:02
B2. "Rockbird" (Harry, Stein) – 3:09

UK and Australasian 12-inch single
A1. "French Kissin in the USA" (dance mix) (Lorre) – 7:25
B1. "French Kissin in the USA" (dub version) (Lorre) – 8:02
B2. "Rockbird" (Harry, Stein) – 3:09

Australasian cassette single
 "French Kissin in the USA" (7-inch version) (Lorre)
 "French Kissin in the USA" (dance mix) (Lorre)
 "French Kissin in the USA" (dub version) (Lorre)
 "Rockbird" (Harry, Stein)

Charts

Weekly charts

Year-end charts

References

1986 singles
1986 songs
Chrysalis Records singles
Debbie Harry songs
French-language songs
Geffen Records singles
Macaronic songs
Song recordings produced by Seth Justman
Songs about kissing
Songs written by Chuck Lorre